Peace is a 1922 bronze sculpture by Bruce Wilder Saville. The sculpture is installed on Capitol Square, the Ohio Statehouse grounds, in Columbus, Ohio.

Description

The bronze allegorical statue depicts a female figure representing peace. The statue measures approximately 13 x 9 x 6 ft., and rests on a granite base measuring approximately 8 ft. 4 in. x 11 ft. 4 1/2 in. x 5 ft. An inscription on the memorial's base reads: "PEACE / COMMEMORATING THE HEROIC SACRIFICES OF OHIO'S SOLDIERS OF / THE CIVIL WAR 1861-65 AND THE LOYAL WOMEN AT THAT PERIOD / ERECTED BY THE WOMAN'S RELIEF CORPS DEPARTMENT OF OHIO / 1923".

History
The sculpture was dedicated on June 26, 1923. It was donated by the Woman's Relief Corps, the auxiliary to the Grand Army of the Republic which consisted of Union veterans from the American Civil War. It was surveyed by the Smithsonian Institution's "Save Outdoor Sculpture!" program in 1993.

References

External links
 
 

1922 sculptures
1923 establishments in Ohio
Allegorical sculptures in the United States
Bronze sculptures in Ohio
Ohio Statehouse
Peace monuments and memorials
Outdoor sculptures in Columbus, Ohio
Sculptures of women in Ohio
Statues in Columbus, Ohio
Woman's Relief Corps
Grand Army of the Republic buildings and structures